Ghosts of West Virginia is the twentieth studio album by American country musician Steve Earle, credited to Steve Earle and the Dukes. It was released on May 22, 2020 under New West Records. Most of the songs were written for the off-Broadway play Coal Country about the Upper Big Branch Mine disaster in 2010. Earle collaborated on the play written by Jessica Blank and Erik Jensen, drawing on interviews with survivors and families of the miners.

Critical reception
Ghosts of West Virginia was met with "universal acclaim" reviews from critics. At Metacritic, which assigns a weighted average rating out of 100 to reviews from mainstream publications, this release received an average score of 82, based on 10 reviews.

Accolades

Track listing

Charts

References

2020 albums
Steve Earle albums
Albums produced by Steve Earle
New West Records albums